The Himalayan water shrew (Chimarrogale himalayica) is a species of mammal in the family Soricidae. It is found in China, India, Japan, Laos, Myanmar, Taiwan, and Vietnam.

References
 

Chimarrogale
Fauna of the Himalayas
Taxonomy articles created by Polbot
Mammals described in 1842